Mariya is a variation of the feminine given name Maria.

People 
 Mariya Abakumova (born 1986), Russian Olympic javelin thrower
 Mariya Agapova (born 1997), Kazakhstani mixed martial arts fighter
 Mariya Alyokhina (born 1988), Russian political activist
 Mariya Babanova (1900–1983), Russian actress
 Mariya Baklakova (born 1997), Russian swimmer
 Mariya Bayda (1922–2002), Russian scout 
 Mariya Bespalova (born 1968), Russian hammer thrower
 Mariya Bolikova (born 1977), Russian sprinter
 Mariya Borovichenko (1925–1943), Soviet soldier
 Mariya Bugakova (born 1985), Uzbekistani former swimmer 
 Mariya Butyrskaya (born 1972), Russian figure skater
 Mariya Dashkina Maddux, Ukrainian modern dancer
 Mariya Dimitrova (born 1976), Bulgarian triple jumper
 Mariya Dolina (1922–2010), Soviet WWII dive bomber pilot and Heroine of the Soviet Union
 Mariya Fadeyeva (born 1958), Russian former rower
 Mariya Gabriel (born 1979), Bulgarian politician
 Mariya Grabovetskaya (born 1987), Kazakhstani weightlifter
 Mariya Grinberg (1908–1978), Russian pianist
 Mariya Gromova (born 1984), Russian synchronized swimmer
 Mariya Havrysh (1931–2001), Ukrainian swimmer
 Mariya Ise (born 1988), Japanese actress
 Mariya Karashka (born 1942), Bulgarian artistic gymnast
 Mariya Kartalova (born 1969), Bulgarian artistic gymnast
 Mariya Kichukova (born 1972), Bulgarian canoeist
 Mariya Kirova (born 1982), better known as simply Maria, Bulgarian singer
 Mariya Kiselyova (born 1974), Russian synchronized swimmer
 Mariya Kocheva (born 1974), Bulgarian swimmer
 Mariya Konovalova (a.k.a. Mariya Pantyukhova]; born 1974), Russian long-distance runner
 Mariya Koroleva (born 1990), American synchronized swimmer
 Mariya Koroteyeva (born 1981), Russian hurdler
 Mariya Koryttseva (born 1985), Ukrainian tennis player
 Mariya Kozhevnikova (born 1984), Russian actress and politician
 Mariya Krivopolenova (1843–1924), Russian folklore performer and storyteller
 Mariya Kuchina (born 1993), Russian athlete
 Mariya Kuznetsova (singer) (1880–1966), Russian opera singer and dancer
 Mariya Kuznetsova (pilot) (1918–1990), Soviet fighter pilot 
 Mariya Itkina (1932–2020), Soviet runner
 Mariya Litoshenko (born 1949), Soviet handball player
 Mariya Liver (born 1990), Ukrainian swimmer
 Mariya Mazina (born 1964), Russian women's épée fencer
 Mariya Melentyeva (1924–1943), Soviet partisan
 Mariya Muzychuk (born 1992), Ukrainian chess player
 Mariya Netesova (born 1983), Russian rhythmic gymnast 
 Mariya Ocher (a.k.a. Mariya Ocheretianskaya; born 1986), Russian musical artist
 Mariya Ohurtsova (a.k.a. Mariya Ogurtsova; born 1983), Ukrainian swimmer
 Mariya Oktyabrskaya (1905–1944), Soviet war hero
 Mariya Onolbayeva (born 1978), Russian ice hockey player
 Mariya Orlyk (born 1930), Ukrainian teacher and politician
 Mariya Ovechkina (born 1991), Russian beauty-contest contestant
 Mariya Panfilova (a.k.a. Mariya Sadilova; born 1987), Russian biathlete
 Mariya Payun (born 1953), Soviet rower
 Mariya Petkova (née Mariya Vergova; born 1950), Bulgarian discus thrower
 Mariya Petrovykh (1908—1979), Russian poet and translator
 Mariya Pinigina (née Mariya Kulchunova; born 1958), Soviet sprinter
 Mariya Pisareva (born 1934), Soviet high-jumper
 Mariya Ralcheva (born 1978), Ukrainian sprint canoer
 Mariya Rudnitskaya (1916–1983), Russian Soviet realist painter, graphic artist, and art teacher
 Mariya Ryemyen (born 1987), Ukrainian sprinter
 Mariya Sarapova (a.k.a. Mariya Sharapova; born 1987), Russian tennis player
 Mariya Savinova (born 1985), Russian middle-distance runner
 Mariya Shah, Indian politician from Uttar Pradesh
 Mariya Shcherba (born 1985), Belarusian swimmer
 Mariya Shcherbina (born 1958), Ukrainian mathematician
 Mariya Shekerova (born 1988), Uzbekistani-Russian Olympic judoka
 Mariya Shorets (born 1990), Russian triathlete
 Mariya Shubina (a.k.a. Mariya Zhubina; born 1930), Soviet canoeist
 Mariya Sidorova (born 1979), Russian handball player
 Mariya Smolyachkova (born 1985), Belarusian hammer thrower
 Mariya Sokova (born 1979), Uzbekistani triple jumper 
 Mariya Stadnik (born 1988), Azerbaijani freestyle wrestler 
 Mariya Stoyanova (born 1947), Bulgarian basketball player
 Mariya Suzuki (born 1991), Japanese singer and actress
 Mariya Svistunova (1778–1866), Russian aristocrat
 Mariya Takeuchi (born 1955), Japanese singer-songwriter
 Mariya Vasilieva (born 1963), Russian doctor of juridical Science 
 Mariya Ivanovna Vassiliéva (1884–1957), Russian painter
 Mariya Voloshchenko (born 1989), Ukrainian diver
 Mariya Yakovenko (born 1982), Russian javelin thrower
 Mariya Yamada (born 1980), Japanese actress
 Mariya Nazarivna Yaremchuk (born 1993), Ukrainian singer and actress
 Mariya Yakovlevna Zerova (1902–1994), Ukrainian mycologist
 Mariya Zhukova (1805–1855), Russian writer
 Mariya Zubova (1749–1799), Russian composer and concert singer

See also
 Maria (disambiguation)
 Maria (given name)

References

Bulgarian feminine given names
Russian feminine given names
Japanese feminine given names
Ukrainian feminine given names